Arthur Baldwin Turnure was an American businessman who founded the fashion and lifestyle magazine Vogue. Turnure founded Vogue as a weekly newspaper in New York on December 17, 1892.

Early life  
Turnure was born to wealthy parents, David Mitchel Turnure and Mary S. Baldwin, in 1856. He graduated from Princeton University to become a lawyer in 1876. He later became an art director at Harper & Brothers.

On May 20, 1890 he married Elizabeth Harrison in New York City.

Vogue 
Turnure founded Vogue magazine on December 17, 1892 in New York. Condé Nast bought Vogue in 1909.

Death 
Turnure left his office feeling ill, and two days later he died of pneumonia. He died in 1906 at the age of 49.

References 

1856 births
18th-century American businesspeople
Princeton University
Vogue (magazine) people
1906 deaths